iPadOS 14 is the second major release of the iPadOS operating system developed by Apple for their iPad line of tablet computers. It was announced on June 22, 2020 at the company's Worldwide Developers Conference (WWDC) as the successor to iPadOS 13, making it the second version of the iPadOS fork from iOS. It was released to the public on September 16, 2020. It was succeeded by iPadOS 15 on September 20, 2021.

Features

Home screen

Widgets
To the left of the first page, the Today View now has new redesigned widgets. Widgets may be added, with options for small, medium, or large widgets, but the widgets can no longer collapse or expand. Widgets of the same size may be stacked over each other and swiped between for convenience; a Smart Stack may be placed which automatically show the most relevant widget to the user based on the time of day. Unlike in iOS 14, widgets cannot be placed directly on to the home screen in iPadOS 14; this was only allowed starting in iPadOS 15.

Compact UI
A series of changes were made in iPadOS 14 to reduce the visual space taken by previously full-screen interfaces; such interfaces now appear and hover in front of an app, allowing for touch (and therefore multitasking) on the app behind. Voice calling interfaces, including Phone, or other third-party apps such as Skype, are made substantially thinner, taking approximately as much space as a notification. Siri's interface is now also compact.

Search and Siri
Improvements to the Search feature on the home screen were made, including a refined UI, quick launcher for apps, more detailed web search, shortcuts to in-app search, and improved as-you-type search suggestions. The search function now appears and functions more like the Spotlight Search feature of macOS.

In addition to being made compact, Siri can now answer a broader set of questions and translate more languages. Users can also share their ETA with contacts and ask for cycling directions.

Storage
iPadOS 14 gains the ability to mount encrypted external drives. However, this capability is limited to APFS-encrypted drives. Upon connecting an APFS-encrypted external drive to the USB-C port on the iPad, the Files app will present the external drive on the sidebar. Selecting the drive will prompt the user to enter the password to unlock the drive.

Supported devices
All the devices that supported iPadOS 13 also support iPadOS 14. Devices include:
iPad Air 2
iPad Air (3rd generation)
iPad Air (4th generation)
iPad (5th generation)
iPad (6th generation)
iPad (7th generation)
iPad (8th generation)
iPad Mini 4
iPad Mini (5th generation)
iPad Pro (all models)

Version history 
The first developer beta of iPadOS 14 was released on June 22, 2020 and the first public beta was released on July 9, 2020. iPadOS 14 was officially released on September 16, 2020. There was no public beta testing of 14.1.

References

External links
 – official site
 – official developer site
iOS Reference Library at the Apple Developer site

14
IPad
Apple Inc. operating systems
Mach (kernel)
Mobile operating systems
Products introduced in 2020
Tablet operating systems